Herman Slough is a fork of Castro Creek in Richmond, California.

Overview
The stream is largely culverted and picks up water from storm drains throughout the Iron Triangle District. The creek once was fed by rainwaters. A portion remains in its original state alongside the Chevron Richmond Refinery.

References

Rivers of Contra Costa County, California
Bodies of water of Richmond, California
Rivers of Northern California
Tributaries of San Francisco Bay